Chicot County is a county located in the southeastern corner of the U.S. state of Arkansas. As of the 2020 census, the population was 10,208. The county seat is Lake Village. Chicot County is Arkansas's 10th county, formed on October 25, 1823, and named after Point Chicot on the Mississippi River. It is part of the Arkansas Delta, lowlands along the river that have been historically important as an area for large-scale cotton cultivation. 

Landmarks around the county include Lake Chicot, North America's largest oxbow lake and Arkansas's largest natural lake; the site of Charles Lindbergh's first night-time flight; and the legendary burial site of Hernando De Soto, near Lake Village.

History
Spanish explorer Hernando de Soto came to this area with his expedition in 1542, settling for a time in the village or territory known as Guachoya. The European-American town of Lake Village later developed in the 19th century at Lake Chicot, formed by an oxbow of the Mississippi River. Eighteenth-century French colonists named it Chicot because of the many cypress trees in the waterways. The word is translated to "stumpy, or knobby".

The area along the Mississippi River and major tributaries was developed as cotton plantations, the major commodity crop before and after the American Civil War of 1861–1865. Enslaved African Americans formed the labor force, comprising a majority of the population in the antebellum years. Major large cotton plantations included Sunnyside (owned in the 20th century by LeRoy Percy, planter and US Senator from Greenville, Mississippi); Florence, Patria, Pastoria, Luna, and Lakeport.

During the war, Union and Confederate forces fought at the Battle of Old River Lake from June 5 to June 6, 1864.

The population of the rural county has declined since its peak in 1940. Earlier in the century, boll weevils threatened the cotton crop, and many African Americans left in the Great Migration for opportunity in northern and midwestern industrial cities. In addition, mechanization of agriculture and consolidation into industrial-style farms has reduced the need for farm labor.

Geography

Major highways

 U.S. Highway 65
 U.S. Highway 82
 U.S. Highway 165
 U.S. Highway 278
 Highway 8
 Highway 35
 Highway 159
 Highway 52

Arkansas 144

Adjacent counties
 Desha County (north)
 Bolivar County, Mississippi (northeast)
 Washington County, Mississippi (east)
 Issaquena County, Mississippi (southeast)
 East Carroll Parish, Louisiana (south)
 West Carroll Parish, Louisiana (south)
 Morehouse Parish, Louisiana (southwest)
 Ashley County (west)
 Drew County (northwest)

Demographics

2020 census

As of the 2020 United States Census, there were 10,208 people, 4,068 households, and 2,636 families residing in the county.

2010 census
As of the 2010 census, there were 11,800 people living in the county. 54.1% were Black or African American, 41.2% White, 0.5% Asian, 0.2% Native American, 3.2% of some other race and 0.8 of two or more races. 4.6% were Hispanic or Latino (of any race).

2000 census
As of the 2000 census, there were 14,117 people, 5,205 households, and 3,643 families living in the county.  The population density was 22 people per square mile (8/km2).  There were 5,974 housing units at an average density of 9 per square mile (4/km2).  The racial makeup of the county was 53.96% Black or African American, 43.24% White, 0.13% Native American, 0.40% Asian, 0.02% Pacific Islander, 1.41% from other races, and 0.85% from two or more races.  2.88% of the population were Hispanic or Latino of any race.

There were 5,205 households, out of which 31.70% had children under the age of 18 living with them, 43.70% were married couples living together, 22.00% had a female householder with no husband present, and 30.00% were non-families. 26.90% of all households were made up of individuals, and 13.00% had someone living alone who was 65 years of age or older.  The average household size was 2.58 and the average family size was 3.12.

In the county, the population was spread out, with 27.50% under the age of 18, 8.60% from 18 to 24, 26.40% from 25 to 44, 22.20% from 45 to 64, and 15.40% who were 65 years of age or older.  The median age was 36 years. For every 100 females there were 94.20 males.  For every 100 females age 18 and over, there were 89.90 males.

The median income for a household in the county was $22,024, and the median income for a family was $27,960. Males had a median income of $25,899 versus $17,115 for females. The per capita income for the county was $12,825.  About 23.10% of families and 28.60% of the population were below the poverty line, including 38.30% of those under age 18 and 20.70% of those age 65 or over.

Since 1940, the population of the county has collapsed. Press reports indicate that in 2013, the largest settlement in the county, Lake Village, Arkansas had two bank branches, two pharmacies, some law firms, two dollar stores, a grocery store, and no retail shops.

Politics
The county voters have traditionally supported the Democratic Party. In the 20th century, the only Democratic presidential candidate to lose the county was George McGovern in 1972. 
The county is part of Arkansas's 1st congressional district. In the Arkansas Senate, the county is in District 26 and is represented by Republican Ben Gilmore. In the Arkansas House of Representatives, it is in District 1 and represented by Republican Mark McElroy. The county supported a measure prohibiting "co-habiting couples" from adopting.

Communities

Cities
 Dermott
 Eudora
 Lake Village (county seat)

Unincorporated communities

Arkla
Bellaire
Cosgrove
Chicot Junction
Empire
Farmwood
Indian
Grand Lake
Hudspeth
Jennie
Lakeport
Lakehall
Luna
McMillian Corner
Readland
Ross Van Ness
Shives
Stuart Island
Wellford

Ghost town
 Eunice

Townships

 Bowie (Dermott)
 Carlton (Lake Village)
 Planters (Eudora)

Notable people
Larry D. Alexander- Visual artist, writer, Bible teacher
Jim Cain - American player of gridiron football
Ruby Grant Martin - lawyer, federal civil rights official
Robert L. Hill - founder of the Progressive Farmers and Household Union of America
Mark D. McElroy - State representative for Chicot County since 2013; resides in Desha County
Lycurgus Johnson, the owner of the Lakeport Plantation, later a state congressman.

See also
 List of lakes in Chicot County, Arkansas
 National Register of Historic Places listings in Chicot County, Arkansas

References

External links

From Wikipedia, the free encyclopedia
County in Arkansas, United StatesEdit
Jump to navigationJump to sea

 
1823 establishments in Arkansas Territory
Populated places established in 1823
Arkansas counties on the Mississippi River
Black Belt (U.S. region)
Majority-minority counties in Arkansas